The 1983–84 season was Galatasaray's 80th in existence and the 26th consecutive season in the 1. Lig. This article shows statistics of the club's players in the season, and also lists all matches that the club have played in the season.

Squad statistics

Players in / out

In

Out

1. Lig

Standings

Matches
Kick-off listed in local time (EET)

Türkiye Kupası
Kick-off listed in local time (EET)

5th Round

6th Round

1/4 Final

Friendly Matches
Kick-off listed in local time (EET)

TSYD Kupası

Donanma Kupası

Attendance

References

 Tuncay, Bülent (2002). Galatasaray Tarihi. Yapı Kredi Yayınları

External links
 Galatasaray Sports Club Official Website 
 Turkish Football Federation – Galatasaray A.Ş. 
 uefa.com – Galatasaray AŞ

Galatasaray S.K. (football) seasons
Turkish football clubs 1983–84 season
1980s in Istanbul
Galatasaray Sports Club 1983–84 season